Marshside is the name of the following places:

 Marshside, Cumbria, England
 Marshside, Kent, England
 Marshside, Merseyside, England
 Marsh Side, Norfolk, England